Petur Alberg (15 December 1885 – 1940) was a Faroese violin player and songwriter from Tórshavn. He composed the anthem of the Faroes, "Mítt alfagra land", or "Tú alfagra land mítt", as it is usually called.

References
Sørensen, Zacharias: Løg til songbók Føroya fólks (1st ed.) p. 364. Tórshavn nótar 2003.

1885 births
1940 deaths
Faroese songwriters
People from Tórshavn
National anthem writers